The 2 E Main / N High is a Central Ohio Transit Authority (COTA) bus service in Columbus, Ohio. The line operates on High Street, the city's main north-south thoroughfare.

The 2 replaced High and Main Streets streetcar lines, both of which were early streetcars line in Columbus. These lines initially served Columbus with horsecars, and horse-drawn omnibuses followed a similar route. The horsecars were replaced with electric streetcars around the 1890s, and later with trolleybuses. In the mid-20th century, the trolleybus line was replaced with a bus line similar to the modern-day 2 E Main / N High.

Attributes
The 2 route was the highest-trafficked in 1987 and 1999.

In 2008, facing overcrowding, service was doubled on the line. and expanded again in 2019.

The Night Owl line (formerly 21 Night Owl) supplements 2 E Main / N High with late-night service along High Street, while the 102 (formerly 2L) provides limited-stop service from Broad and High north to Westerville.

The route is frequented by Ohio State University students, as the campus is on the transit line. In 2000, about a fifth of the average weekday riders on the routes were OSU students.

History

The first mass transit in Columbus was a horsecar line, which operated along a two-mile stretch on High Street beginning in 1863. The line ran from Union Station at Naughten Street (now Nationwide Boulevard) south to Livingston Avenue.

An initiative from about 2006 to 2009 proposed to bring streetcars back to Columbus. The Columbus Streetcar was proposed for three different routes; the most popular would have been a 2.1-mile route from German Village to the Short North via High Street (the same route the CBUS utilizes today). The Great Recession affected the city's budget, and paired with a failure to acquire state or federal funding, forced the plan to be cut.

See also
 List of COTA routes and services
 Public transit in Columbus, Ohio

References

External links
 Timetable

Bus transportation in Ohio
Central Ohio Transit Authority
Transportation in Columbus, Ohio
Transportation in Franklin County, Ohio
High Street (Columbus, Ohio)